DreamWorks Pictures (also known as DreamWorks SKG and formerly DreamWorks Studios, commonly referred to as DreamWorks) is an American film company and distribution label of Amblin Partners. It was originally founded on October 12, 1994 as a live-action film studio by Steven Spielberg, Jeffrey Katzenberg, and David Geffen (together, SKG), of which they owned 72%. The studio formerly distributed its own and third-party films. It has produced or distributed more than ten films with box-office grosses of more than $100 million each.

In December 2005, the founders agreed to sell the studio to Viacom, parent of Paramount Pictures. The sale was completed in February 2006 (this version is now named DW Studios). In 2008, DreamWorks announced its intention to end its partnership with Paramount and made a deal to produce films with India's Reliance Anil Dhirubhai Ambani Group, re-creating DreamWorks Pictures as an independent entity. The following year, DreamWorks entered into a distribution agreement with Walt Disney Studios Motion Pictures, wherein Disney would distribute DreamWorks films through the Touchstone Pictures label; the deal continued until August 2016. Since October 2016, Universal Pictures has distributed most of the films produced by DreamWorks Pictures. Currently, DreamWorks operates out of offices at Universal Studios Hollywood.

DreamWorks is also distinct from its former animation division of the same name, which was spun off in 2004 and became a subsidiary of NBCUniversal in 2016. Spielberg's company continues to use the original DreamWorks trademarks under license from DreamWorks Animation.

History

DreamWorks SKG founding 
The original company was founded following Jeffrey Katzenberg's resignation from The Walt Disney Company in 1994. Katzenberg approached Steven Spielberg and David Geffen about forming a live-action and animation film studio, which had not been done in decades due to the risk and expense, but all three were very successful. They agreed on three conditions: They would make fewer than nine movies a year, they would be free to work for other studios if they chose, and they would go home in time for dinner. They officially founded DreamWorks SKG on October 12, 1994, with financial backing of $33 million from each of the three partners plus $500 million from Microsoft co-founder Paul Allen, and $300 million from CJ Group heiress . Lee's CJ Group would acquire distribution rights to DreamWorks films in Asia except Japan. Their new studio was based at offices on the Universal Studios lot, in the same bungalow as Amblin Entertainment. Despite access to sound stages and sets, DreamWorks preferred to film motion pictures on location. Usually, however, the company would film in a soundstage or set in a major studio.

In December 1994, DreamWorks Television was formed after DreamWorks agreed to a $200 million seven-year television production joint venture with Capital Cities/ABC. The company was set up to produce series for broadcast networks, cable channels and first run syndication, with no first-look guarantee for ABC, but financial incentives favored the network. Their first show, Champs, was scheduled as a mid-season replacement for ABC. Dan McDermott was named the division's chief executive in June 1995. DreamWorks Television's first success was Spin City on ABC, the parent company of which was bought by The Walt Disney Company in February 1996. In 2002, the DreamWorks joint venture agreement with ABC ended. That agreement was replaced by a development agreement with NBC, with a first look clause. In 2013, DreamWorks Television merged with Amblin Television.

In 1995, traditional animation artists from Amblimation joined the new studio, which led to DreamWorks buying part of Pacific Data Images, a company specializing in visual effects, and renaming it PDI/DreamWorks. Both were software divisions and would merge later on. By then, DreamWorks had the traditional animators working for their animation department, and the computer animators worked on CG films. Amblimation would be shut down in 1997, leading the staff to join DreamWorks Animation. The same year, DreamWorks Interactive, a computer and video game developer and joint venture between DreamWorks and Microsoft, was founded. On February 24, 2000, Electronic Arts announced the acquisition of DreamWorks Interactive and merged it with EA Pacific and Westwood Studios to form EA Los Angeles, later Danger Close Games.

In June 1995, DreamWorks announced that it had signed a $1 billion deal with MCA Inc. (then parent company of Universal Pictures) to distribute its theatrical releases in other countries and its home video releases worldwide over 10 years. MCA also bought a 2% stake in the company for $54 million.

In 1996, the company's record label, DreamWorks Records, was founded, the first project of which was George Michael's album Older. The first band signed to the label was eels, who released their debut album Beautiful Freak that year. The record company never lived up to expectations, though, and was sold in October 2003 to Universal Music Group, which operated the label as DreamWorks Nashville. That label was shut down in 2005 when its flagship artist, Toby Keith, departed to form his own label.

In 1997, DreamWorks Pictures released its first three feature films, The Peacemaker, a film about terrorism; Amistad, Spielberg's first film for the studio about an African slave rebellion and the aftermath of the massacre; and Mouse Hunt, the studio's first family film about two brothers trying to fight a mischievous mouse.

In 1998, the United States 9th Circuit Court of Appeals upheld a lawsuit against DreamWorks for trademark infringement by DreamWorks Production Group, Inc., a company mostly specializing in Star Trek conventions. The same year, DreamWorks Animation produced its first full-length animated features, Antz and The Prince of Egypt, which were distributed by DreamWorks Pictures. DreamWorks Pictures continued to distribute DreamWorks Animation productions through their distribution name until 2004.

In 2000, DreamWorks was planning on building a studio backlot after buying 1,087 acres of land in the Playa Vista area in Los Angeles. It was to be complete with 18 sound stages, with many office buildings and a lake. There would also be new homes, schools, churches, and museums. The project was to be completed in 2001, but was cancelled for financial reasons. Starting in 1999, DreamWorks won three consecutive Academy Awards for Best Picture for American Beauty, Gladiator and A Beautiful Mind (the latter two were co-productions with Universal Pictures). The same year, Go Fish Pictures, a division of DreamWorks with the objective to distribute art-house, independent and foreign films, was founded. The division experienced success with the anime films Millennium Actress (2003) and Ghost in the Shell 2: Innocence (2004), respectively, which led them to venture into releasing live-action films, with the release of The Chumscrubber. However, The Chumscrubber was a commercial and critical failure, which led DreamWorks to shut down the division in 2007 shortly after the release of the Japanese film Casshern. In 2002, DreamWorks signed a deal with In Demand.

For the period beginning October 1, 2004 to January 31, 2006, DreamWorks Pictures distributed its films in the North American domestic theatrical and worldwide television market, with international theatrical and worldwide home entertainment distribution by Universal Pictures. On October 27, 2004, DreamWorks Animation was spun off into a separate public company.

David Geffen admitted that DreamWorks came close to bankruptcy twice. Under Katzenberg's watch, the studio suffered a $125 million loss on Sinbad: Legend of the Seven Seas, and also overestimated the DVD demand for Shrek 2. In 2005, out of their two large budget pictures, War of the Worlds was produced as a joint effort with Paramount Pictures which was the first to reap a significant amount of profits, while The Island bombed at the domestic box office but turned a profit internationally through Warner Bros.

Paramount ownership 
In December 2005, the original Viacom, the then-parent of Paramount Pictures, agreed to purchase the live-action studio, still keeping the original name and producing/distribution name. The deal was valued at approximately $1.6 billion, an amount that included about $400 million in debt assumptions. The acquisition of the live-action DreamWorks studio was completed by the second iteration of Viacom, which had recently split from the original at the end of 2005, on February 1, 2006.

On March 17, 2006, Viacom agreed to sell a controlling interest in the DreamWorks Pictures live-action library to Soros Strategic Partners and Dune Entertainment II. The film library was valued at $900 million. Paramount Pictures retained the worldwide distribution rights to those films, as well as various ancillary rights, including music publishing (the music publishing rights were later licensed to Sony/ATV Music Publishing when the company acquired Viacom's Famous Music subdivision), sequels and merchandising. The sale was completed on May 8, 2006. On February 8, 2010, Viacom repurchased Soros' controlling stake in the DreamWorks Pictures library for around $400 million.

Reliance-Spielberg joint venture 
In June 2008, it reported that DreamWorks was looking for financing that would allow it to continue operations, but as an independent production company, once its deal with Paramount ended later that year. Several public equity funds were approached for financing, including Blackstone Group, Fuse Global, TPG Capital and several others, but all passed on the deal given their understanding of the Hollywood markets. On September 22, 2008, it was announced that DreamWorks closed a deal with Indian investment firm Reliance Anil Dhirubhai Ambani Group to create a $1.2 billion stand-alone production company and end its ties with Paramount. In January 2009, Spielberg entered a licensing agreement with DreamWorks Animation to use the DreamWorks trademarks, logo, and name for film productions and releases.

On February 9, 2009, DreamWorks Pictures entered into a long-term, 30-picture distribution deal with Walt Disney Studios Motion Pictures, by which DreamWorks' films would be released through the Touchstone Pictures banner, with Disney collecting a 10 percent distribution fee. The deal also included co-funding via a $175 million loan by Walt Disney Studios to DreamWorks for production and access to slots in Disney's pay television agreement, then with Starz. The agreement was reported to have come after negotiations broke off with Universal Pictures just days earlier. DreamWorks raised $325 million from Reliance Entertainment and an additional $325 million in debt in 2009. On August 18, 2009, DreamWorks and Reliance signed a three-year, $825 million pact for up to six films a year.

DreamWorks' slate of films in 2011, I Am Number Four, Cowboys & Aliens, and Fright Night failed, while The Help, Real Steel and Spielberg's War Horse had success at the box office. This left DreamWorks so financially drained that by 2011, the company was seeking additional funding from Reliance. Reliance gave a $200 million investment on April 10, 2012. Under the deal, DreamWorks Pictures scaled back production to three films per year and sought co-financiers on big budget films, such as 20th Century Fox, who co-financed Lincoln and Bridge of Spies. The company continued to have Disney distribute and market their films. On August 29, 2012, after re-negotiating their agreement with Disney, DreamWorks formed a deal with Mister Smith Entertainment to distribute its films in EMEA, while Disney would continue to distribute in North America, Latin America, Australia, Russia, and some territories in Asia.

Amblin Partners venture 
On September 2, 2015, it was reported that DreamWorks and Disney would not renew their distribution deal, which was set to expire in August 2016, with The Light Between Oceans being released in September as the final DreamWorks film distributed by Disney under their original distribution agreement. During that time, DreamWorks was in early negotiations with Universal Pictures to distribute its upcoming films. The contract allowing Spielberg to license the DreamWorks name and logo from Jeffrey Katzenberg's DreamWorks Animation was set to expire on January 1, 2016, leading to media speculation that Spielberg would not renew the pact. Disney retained the film rights to the fourteen DreamWorks films it released, as well as acquiring the "DreamWorks II Distribution Co. LLC" copyright from DreamWorks and Reliance on December 11, 2015.

On December 16, 2015, Spielberg, Reliance, Entertainment One, and Participant Media partnered to launch the content production company Amblin Partners, relegating DreamWorks to a brand for adult-themed films produced under the new company. In addition to DreamWorks, the new company also would produce films under the Amblin Entertainment and Participant banners. On the same day, Amblin Partners announced a five-year distribution deal with Universal, under which the company's films would be distributed and marketed by either the main Universal label or its specialty label, Focus Features. The Girl on the Train was the first film released under the new agreement, though a few films, like The Post and The Trial of the Chicago 7, were released by other distributors.

Logo

Original
The original DreamWorks logo features a boy sitting on a crescent moon with a fishing rod at night. The general idea for the logo was the idea of the company's co-founder, Steven Spielberg, who wanted a CGI image. Illustrator Robert Hunt was commissioned to execute the idea as a painting, and he used his son as the model. The logo was then turned into a motion graphic at Industrial Light & Magic, in collaboration with Kaleidoscope Films, Dave Carson and Clint Goldman. It was animated by ILM animation supervisor Wes Takahashi. Music accompanying the logo to start in many live-action DreamWorks films was specially composed by John Williams.

Animation 

The animation logo had music adapted from the track "Fairytale" for the film Shrek, based on the children's picture book of the same name by William Steig. The logo was composed by Harry Gregson-Williams and made its debut in 2004, with the release of Shrek 2. Two years after its acquisition by Universal Pictures in 2016, the logo received a new fanfare composed by John Powell and incorporate some cues from Shrek 2 and tones from Williams' original DreamWorks fanfare to create the music for the logo. The new fanfare debuted in 2019, with the release of How to Train Your Dragon: The Hidden World, for which Powell also composed the score for. In 2022, Harry Gregson-Williams composed a remastered version of the fanfare, with the debut of Puss in Boots: The Last Wish.

DreamWorks Home Entertainment 

DreamWorks Home Entertainment was a home entertainment unit of DreamWorks Pictures, formed on October 12, 1998. The company's releases were originally distributed by Universal Studios Home Entertainment, a deal that would last until 2005. After DreamWorks was purchased by Paramount Pictures on February 1, 2006, DreamWorks Home Entertainment was merged into Paramount Home Entertainment and used the company's name as a label for films released under the live-action DreamWorks banner until it was shuttered in 2009 after when the main DreamWorks studio was spun off from Paramount and became an independent company.

Filmography

Primary owners and distributors 
 Paramount Pictures
 Walt Disney Studios Motion Pictures 
 Universal Pictures

References 

 
Amblin Partners
Film distributors of the United States
Film production companies of the United States
Entertainment companies based in California
Companies based in Los Angeles County, California
Universal City, California
American companies established in 1994
Mass media companies established in 1994
1994 establishments in California
2006 mergers and acquisitions
Steven Spielberg
Former Viacom subsidiaries
Reliance Entertainment subsidiaries
Universal Pictures
David Geffen
Jeffrey Katzenberg